Various lists of the Seven Wonders of Romania have been compiled from past to the present day, to catalogue Romania's most spectacular artificial structures.

Lists

Evenimentul Zileis Seven Wonders

Imperator Travels Seven Wonders

Seven Wonders Wonders of Romania

Gallery

See also
 Seven Wonders of the World
 Tourism in Romania
 Seven Natural Wonders of Romania

References

Ancient history
Cultural lists
Tourist attractions in Romania
Romanian culture